Pynoclavella arenosa is a species of tunicate in the family Clavelinidae. The scientific name of the species, Oxycorynia arenosa, was first validly published by Kott in 1972.

Habitat
This sea slug can be found in waters of Southern Australia.

References

Animals described in 1972
Marine fauna of Southern Australia
Aplousobranchia